The Cavanilles Institute (Valencia) is located on the Parque Científico de Paterna, and was established in 1998 by the University of Valencia. The goal of this research center is to tackle questions relating to biodiversity from multiple perspectives, studying from morphology to animal behavior, from molecular genetic variation to quantitative variation, and integrating experts in complementary fields such as molecular biology, genetics, population biology, taxonomy, ecology, neurobiology or ethology.

External links
 The Cavanilles Institute web site
 University of Valencia web site

1998 establishments in Spain
University of Valencia
Schools in Paterna